Donald G. Silvestri (born December 25, 1968) is a former American football placekicker for various professional football teams and leagues including the New York Jets of the National Football League (NFL).  He was signed by the Seattle Seahawks, of the NFL, as an undrafted free agent in 1993.  He played college football at University of Pittsburgh. He is the president of Debt.com and a founding member of the charity organization Parkland Cares.

Early years
Silvestri was a two-year football letterman at the University of Pittsburgh from 1990 to 1991. Silvestri attended Pennridge High School in Perkasie, Pennsylvania.

Professional career
Silvestri has been a member of the Seattle Seahawks (1993), Buffalo Bills (1994), New York Jets (1995–1997), London Monarchs (1995, 1997, 1998), Albany Firebirds (1998–1999), Florida Bobcats (2000) and the Canadian Football League's American expansion team Baltimore Stallions (1993).

NFL Europe
On May 7, 1995, Silvestri created history with the London Monarchs after kicking professional football's first four-point field goal, awarded for successful attempts from 50 yards or more in the NFL sanctioned World League of American Football (WLAF).

National Football League
Silvestri established himself as one of the NFL's leading kickoff specialists in 1995. He led the AFC and finished 2nd in the NFL to Morten Anderson with 14 touchbacks. He had 8 games with at least 1 touchback and had 5 games with 2 or more.

Arena Football League
Silvestri is the only Arena Football League player in history to finish a season with a perfect extra point percentage with the Florida Bobcats in 2000.
Silvestri was a key member of the Arena League champion Albany Firebirds in 1999.

Personal life
Silvestri lives in South Florida and is very active in his local community.  He is currently a member of the National Football League Alumni Association and the South Florida Pitt Club, an Alumni club of the University of Pittsburgh, and participates in several local charities including the Boys and Girls Clubs and Fellowship of Christian Athletes.

References

1968 births
Living people
American football placekickers
London Monarchs players
Florida Bobcats players
Players of American football from Pittsburgh
Pittsburgh Panthers football players
Albany Firebirds players
New York Jets players
People from Broward County, Florida
American expatriate sportspeople in England